Belgenland was an iron-hulled sail-steamer that was launched in England in 1878 and spent most of her career as a Belgian transatlantic ocean liner. She was renamed Venere in 1904 and scrapped in Italy in 1905.

Building
Barrow Shipbuilding Co built Belgenland in Barrow-in-Furness, Lancashire as yard number 59. She was launched on 24 December 1878 and completed in 1879.

Belgenland had four masts. At different times she was rigged as a jackass-barque and a schooner. She also had a two-cylinder compound steam engine, which was rated at 444 NHP. She had a single funnel.

The ship was built for Société Anonyme de Navigation Belgo-Américaine, who registered her in Antwerp and appointed Red Star Line to manage her.

Belgenland
On 30 March 1879 Belgenland left Antwerp on her maiden voyage to Philadelphia. Her last voyage on this route was on 6 July 1895.

In 1895 American Line chartered Belgenland, and had her reclassified to carry 150 second-class and 1,000 third-class passengers. On 31 July 1895 she began her first voyage on her new route, which was between Philadelphia and Liverpool. She began her last voyage on this route on 17 October 1903.

In 1903 American Line returned Belgenland to her owners, who changed her port of registration to Liverpool. She was given the UK official number 115353 and code letters TSRF. She was reclassified for third class passengers only, and Red Star Line put her back on the route between Antwerp and Philadelphia.

In 1904 Belgenlands port of registration was changed back to Antwerp. She began her last voyage between Antwerp and Philadelphia on 7 December 1904.

Venere
L Donegani, an Italian shipowner, bought Belgenland, renamed her Venere, and registered her in Livorno. She was scrapped in September 1905 in Genoa.

References

Bibliography

1878 ships
Merchant ships of Italy
Ocean liners
Passenger ships of Belgium
Passenger ships of the United Kingdom
Ships built in Barrow-in-Furness
Steamships of Belgium
Steamships of the United Kingdom